Skycrest is a neighborhood in southwestern Lexington, Kentucky, United States. It takes its name from its location on a ridge between Wolf Run Creek and Vaughns Branch Creek that provides a panoramic view downtown Lexington. Its boundaries are Della Drive to the north, Beacon Hill Drive to the west, Furlong Drive and Spring Meadows Drive to the south, and Harrodsburg Road to the east.

Neighborhood statistics
 Area: 
 Population: 781
 Population density: 4,446 people per square mile
 Median household income: $48,490
 Median age: 30.9

Public school districts
 Elementary: Picadome 
 Middle: Jessie Clark 
 High: Lafayette

External links
 http://www.city-data.com/neighborhood/Skycrest-Lexington-KY.html

References

Neighborhoods in Lexington, Kentucky